Pepe Plata was a 1990 Spanish-language sitcom produced by DIC Entertainment and aired on  Univision with 65 episodes.

Episodes

Recuerdos de Alfonso
Tortilla Mistica
Rock & Roll Pepe
Vamos a Bailar
El Dinosaurio de Pepe

DVD release

DIC Entertainment currently has no plans to release the show on DVD at this time.

External links
 

1990s American sitcoms
Univision original programming
Television series by DIC Entertainment
Television series by DHX Media